People Power Coalition (PPC), formerly called "EDSA Forces", was a Philippine administration-based political multi-party electoral alliance in the May 14, 2001 midterm Legislative elections.  The coalition was created after the EDSA Revolution of 2001 that ousted Joseph Estrada from the presidency.  The coalition included Lakas–Christian Muslim Democrats, the United Muslim Democrats of the Philippines, Liberal Party, the Nationalist People's Coalition, Aksyon Demokratiko, Nacionalista Party, Partido Demokratiko Pilipino–Lakas ng Bayan, Partido para sa Demokratikong Reporma–Lapiang Manggagawa, the Probinsya Muna Development Initiative and numerous major regional and party-list political parties.

Slogan
The Coalition devised an acronym for the 13 senatorial candidates of PPC which is: VOT FOR D CHAMMP (stands for Vote for the Champ or Champion) V for Villar; O for Osmeña; T for Tañada; F for Flavier; O for Obet, R for Recto; D for Drilon; C for Chato; H for Herrera; A for Arroyo; M for Monsod; M for Magsaysay; and P for Pangilinan.

The Senatorial Slate

Election results
8 out of 13 candidates won the possible 13 seats in the Senate namely: (in order of votes received)
 Joker Arroyo
 Franklin Drilon
 Juan Flavier
 Ramon Magsaysay Jr.
 Serge Osmeña
 Francis Pangilinan
 Ralph Recto
 Manny Villar

See also
 Puwersa ng Masa, People Power Coalition's rival coalition
 Lakas NUCD 1998 Senatorial Slate, the Ramos' administration's senatorial slate during the 1998 national elections
 Lakas-Laban Coalition, the name of the pro-Ramos coalition in the 1995 midterm elections.
 Hugpong ng Pagbabago,

References

Defunct political party alliances in the Philippines